Chucri Zaidan will be a monorail station of Line 17-Gold of ViaMobilidade, which is currently under construction, and will connect Line 9-Emerald to Congonhas Airport.

Chucri Zaidan station will be placed in the crossing of Avenida Jornalista Roberto Marinho with Avenida Doutor Chucri Zaidan, which will attend TV studios of TV Globo and ETEC Jornalista Roberto Marinho.

History
Initially, in the São Paulo Metro expansion plans, Line 17-Gold should be open until 2014, connecting with São Paulo–Morumbi station of Line 4-Yellow, at the time that Morumbi Stadium was considered one of the hosts for 2014 FIFA World Cup.

After that, the promise of opening of the line was delayed to 2016, end of 2017, 2018, December 2020, mid of 2021, and, currently, to 2nd semester of 2022.

The construction of the station was resumed on June 20, 2016, along with construction in station Vila Cordeiro and Campo Belo. At the time, the construction of the stations was paralyzed for more than a year.

Toponymy
Chucri Zaidan was a doctor of Syrian origin naturalized Brazilian, born in Damascus, Ottoman Empire on 29 October 1891. Had classes of Medicine in the Medical Sciences College of the American University of Beirut, graduating in 1916. He was medic official of the Ottoman army during World War I, and was made prisoner by the British army, being in Egypt until 1920. Migrated to Brazil in 1925 and was one of the first foreign medics to revalidate his diploma in the country. Placed himself in São Paulo, where he exercised obstetric medicine in Hospital Pró-Mater, at the same time he had a private clinic. His popularity, for attending to the poor for free, led to his receiving in 1966 the title of Paulistano Citizen of the Municipal Chamber of São Paulo. Died on 16 September 1980.

In his honor, Avenida Ao Longo do Dreno do Brooklin received the name Doutor Chucri Zaidan through the Executive Order no. 18,226 of 22 September 1982.

Station layout

References

São Paulo Metro stations
Proposed railway stations in Brazil
Railway stations scheduled to open in 2024